Gray is a city in Jones County, Georgia, United States. The population was 3,276 at the 2010 census, up from 1,811 at the 2000 census. The city is the county seat of Jones County. It is part of the Macon Metropolitan Area.

History
Gray was founded in the 1850s and named for local resident James M. Gray. In 1905, the seat of Jones County was transferred to Gray.

Geography
U.S. Route 129 passes through the center of town, leading northeast  to Eatonton and southwest  to Macon.

Gray is drained to the west by tributaries of Walnut Creek, flowing to the Ocmulgee River, and to the east by tributaries of Commissioner Creek, flowing to the Oconee River.

Demographics

2020 census

As of the 2020 United States census, there were 3,436 people, 1,219 households, and 798 families residing in the city.

2010 census
As of the census of 2010, there were 3,276 people, 1,171 households, and 827 families residing in the city. There were 1,288 housing units, of which 117, or 9.1%, were vacant. The racial makeup of the city was 69.4% white, 28.1% African American, 0.1% American Indian or Alaska Native, 0.6% Asian, 0.3% some other race, and 1.4% from two or more races. 1.3% of the population were Hispanic or Latino of any race.

Of the 1,171 households, 42.3% had children under the age of 18 living with them, 46.4% were headed by married couples living together, 20.3% had a female householder with no husband present, and 29.4% were non-families. 26.9% of all households were made up of individuals, and 13.0% were someone living alone who was 65 years of age or older. The average household size was 2.62, and the average family size was 3.17.

In the city, 28.3% of the population were under the age of 18, 7.8% were from 18 to 24, 28.5% from 25 to 44, 22.0% from 45 to 64, and 13.5% were 65 years of age or older. The median age was 34.5 years. For every 100 females, there were 87.2 males. For every 100 females age 18 and over, there were 83.6 males.

For the period 2012–2016, the estimated median annual income for a household was $59,722, and the median income for a family was $82,781. The per capita income for the city was $25,679. Male full-time workers had a median income of $43,162, versus $35,100 for females. 10.4% of the population and 8.6% of families were below the poverty line. 12.5% of the population under the age of 18 and 12.8% of those 65 or older were living in poverty.

Government and emergency services
Gray's city council sets policy for the operations of the city, approves the city's annual budget, passes ordinances, and hears and acts on requests for zoning, rezoning, and annexation. The mayor, Ed Barbee, is the chief executive officer of the city, appoints the judge, chairs the meetings and is the chief financial officer of the city. Gray is protected by many agencies, including the Gray Volunteer Fire Department (John Eisele, Chief), Gray Police Department (Adam Lowe, Chief), Jones County Sheriff's Office (Butch Reece, Sheriff), Jones County Fire Rescue and Emergency Management (Don Graham, Director)

Education

Jones County School District 
The Jones County School District holds pre-school to grade twelve, and consists of four elementary schools, two middle schools, and one high school. The district has 295 full-time teachers and over 5,014 students.
Dames Ferry Elementary School
Turnerwoods Elementary School
Gray Elementary School
Mattie Wells Elementary School
Gray Station Middle School
Clifton Ridge Middle School
Jones County High School

References

External links
 City of Gray official website

Cities in Georgia (U.S. state)
Cities in Jones County, Georgia
County seats in Georgia (U.S. state)
Macon metropolitan area, Georgia
Populated places established in the 1850s
1850s establishments in Georgia (U.S. state)